The St. Theresa of Avila Roman Catholic Church is a church located at 8666 Quincy Street in Detroit, Michigan. It was listed on the National Register of Historic Places in 1989.

Description

The St. Theresa of Avila Roman Catholic Parish Complex consists of the church, rectory, school, and convent. All of the buildings are essentially Neo-Romanesque in character, and are constructed of dark red brick trimmed with Indiana limestone.

The church is in the Italian Romanesque style, with Byzantine and Art Deco influences. It has a gable front facade with towers at the sides. The entrance is through a five-arched, two-story Romanesque arcaded portico. Above the entrance is a round window flanked with arched niches.

The school is a three-story I-shaped building; the rectory is a five-bay center entrance house with Romanesque Revival details. The three-story convent building, which was built during the Great Depression, features more modest ornamentation. A central pavilion containing the entrance divides the building into three elements.

Significance
The St. Theresa of Avila Parish was built as an Irish-American parish, built at a time when the prosperity of the community was such that this magnificent complex could be afforded. The need for this building reflects the population boom in the city brought about by the automobile industry.

The parish was closed in 1989; the Allen Academy, a K-12 charter school, used the school building from 1999 to 2016.

References

External links

Allen Academy

Roman Catholic churches in Detroit
Irish-American culture in Michigan
Churches in the Roman Catholic Archdiocese of Detroit
Former Roman Catholic church buildings in Michigan
Churches on the National Register of Historic Places in Michigan
Roman Catholic churches completed in 1919
National Register of Historic Places in Detroit
1919 establishments in Michigan
20th-century Roman Catholic church buildings in the United States